Gordon Langford (11 May 1930 – 18 April 2017) was an English composer, arranger and performer. He is well known for his brass band compositions and arrangements. He was also a composer of choral and orchestral music, winning an Ivor Novello award for best light music composition for his March from the Colour Suite in 1971.

Biography
Langford was born in Edgware, Middlesex in May 1930 as Gordon Maris Colman. His father was a precision toolmaker. He was a prodigious child, beginning piano lessons aged five. At nine, one of his compositions received a public performance. He attended Bedford Modern School, and he went on to win a scholarship to the Royal Academy of Music where he studied piano and composition with Norman Demuth. It was Demuth who suggested that he should change his surname or use a pseudonym. Hence, he changed his name to become Gordon Colman Langford.

In 1951, during his army service with the Royal Artillery Band, he made his first BBC broadcast as a solo pianist. After leaving the army, he worked with seaside orchestras, a touring opera company and as a ship's musician, but it was during the 1960s he came to prominence as a pianist, arranger and composer on BBC programmes such as Music in the Air, Melody around the World and Ronnie Barker's Lines From My Grandfather's Forehead. In later life he lived in East Devon, mainly composing but occasionally appearing in recordings, concerts and broadcasts.

In 2011 he was nominated for a Fellowship of the Royal Academy of Music (FRAM) by the Governing Body of the Academy. He died in April 2017.

Works
Langford won an Ivor Novello Award for best light music composition for his March from the Colour Suite in 1971. He is perhaps best known as a brass band composer and arranger, with a string of CDs to his name. In particular, the test pieces Facets of Glass and Rhapsody for trombone are well known. He also arranged the works of other composers, such as Henry Mancini, Jerry Goldsmith and John Williams.

Langford's career had a notable relationship with the BBC. Some of his compositions and arrangements were used as Test Card music in the 1960s and '70s, with such titles as Hebridean Hoedown, The Lark in the Clear Air and Royal Daffodil being remembered by Test Card aficionados. He also wrote and arranged music for Friday Night is Music Night, as well as numerous other BBC programmes. A CD of his original compositions for orchestra performed by the BBC Concert Orchestra conducted by Rumon Gamba was released in 2003.

Langford produced many choral arrangements for the King's Singers in the 1970s. He was also known for his theatre compositions, such as The Crooked Mile and The House of Cards. Langford was often used by Hollywood as a score orchestrator, with Return of the Jedi, Superman II, The First Great Train Robbery, Clash of the Titans and Return to Oz to his name.

In 1974 he released a demo album entitled The Amazing Music of the Electronic ARP Synthesizer. This contained several compositions of his own, plus cover versions, played entirely on the then new innovation, the ARP synth, of pieces as diverse as "Yellow Submarine", "Raindrops Keep Fallin' on My Head", "Cocktails for Two", "Light Cavalry Overture" and Mozart's Symphony No. 40.

Later compositions include his Berceuse and Burlesque for bassoon and orchestra, performed on 1 February 2008 at Axminster.

References

External links

1930 births
2017 deaths
20th-century classical composers
20th-century English composers
20th-century British male musicians
Alumni of the Royal Academy of Music
Brass band composers
English classical composers
English male classical composers
Light music composers
People educated at Bedford Modern School
People from Edgware